Nordend-West and Nordend-Ost are two quarters of Frankfurt am Main, Germany. The division into a western and an eastern part is mostly for administrative purposes, as the Nordend is generally considered an entity. Both city districts are part of the Ortsbezirk Innenstadt III.

References

Districts of Frankfurt